The 1974–75 Allsvenskan was the 41st season of the top division of Swedish handball. 10 teams competed in the league. Västra Frölunda IF won the regular season, but HK Drott won the playoffs and claimed their first Swedish title. IF Saab and IFK Lidingö were relegated.

League table

Playoffs

Semifinals
 HK Drott−Västra Frölunda IF 15−15, 14−14, 16−14 (HK Drott advance to the finals)
 IFK Kristianstad−IK Heim 15−17, 20−15, 14−13 (IFK Kristianstad advance to the finals)

Finals
 HK Drott-IFK Kristianstad 18−18, 14−12 (HK Drott champions)

References 

Swedish handball competitions